Freelance Records existed during the 1980s and 1990s and released jazz albums on LP & CD.  Some of these albums were reissued on Evidence Records.

Discography

Jazz record labels